William Appleyard may refer to:

William Appleyard (MP), for Norwich
Bill Appleyard (1878–1958), English association (soccer) footballer of the 1900s
William Appleyard (rugby league), rugby league footballer of the 1890s
Will Appleyard, English footballer